Joe Shelby "Josh" Griffith (born August 15, 19??) is an American soap opera writer and producer.

Personal life
Born on August 15, in the U.S. state of New York, Josh is the son of Joe (Rip) Griffith and Sue Estes Griffith, both teachers and artists.

Career
Griffith began his writing career on Santa Barbara in 1988 and continued writing for the show until 1991 when he moved over to One Life to Live, where he began as an associate head writer under Michael Malone before being promoted to co-head writer in early 1992. Under his and Malone's tenure at One Life to Live, the show won a Daytime Emmy Award for Outstanding Writing in 1994. Griffith left the show in early 1995.

In 1997, Griffith was co-creator of the NBC Daytime soap opera Sunset Beach along with Robert Guza Jr. The show ran for nearly three years before being cancelled in December 1999. In the spring of 2003, Griffith and Michael Malone returned to One Life to Live for a second stint as head writers, however they remained with the show for just a year. After leaving, Griffith became a script writer on CBS Daytime's As the World Turns under head writer Hogan Sheffer, who shortly afterwards stepped down as head writer. He would later return to the show briefly between 2009 and 2010.

In 2006, vice president of CBS Daytime, Barbara Bloom, brought Griffith over to The Young and the Restless as a creative consultant and breakdown writer under executive producer and head writer Lynn Marie Latham; within three months, he was promoted to co-executive producer to work alongside of Latham.

Griffith assumed full executive producer duties after Latham was fired for joining the 2007-2008 Writers Guild of America strike. During the strike, Griffith became a strikebreaker, adopting financial core status so that he could work while Guild members were on strike.

In December 2007, Maria Arena Bell became his co-head writer.

In August 2008, Griffith was fired from his executive producer duties by Barbara Bloom and Steven Kent of Sony Pictures Television, leading to Bell becoming executive producer and head writer and later replacing him with Paul Rauch. In 2009, Griffith briefly worked as a writer on General Hospital. In July 2012, it was announced that Griffith had been rehired on The Young and the Restless as the sole head writer following Bell's dismissal; he would work alongside new executive producer Jill Farren Phelps. Episodes under their direction began airing on October 12, 2012.

In August 2013, speculation and reports indicated that Griffith had resigned as head writer, reportedly due to "creative differences" with Phelps. Further speculation adds that Shelly Altman may take over as the new head writer, alongside Tracey Thomson or Jean Passanante may be brought aboard as a new co-head writer. In February 2015, Griffith was hired as co-head writer of Days of Our Lives, alongside re-hired former head, Dena Higley. Griffith began his role as co-head scribe on February 16, 2015, with the material airing on August 19, 2015.

In February 2016, it was reported that Griffith would be departing Days of Our Lives as co-head writer, with Ryan Quan serving as his replacement. Griffith's last episode aired on September 2, 2016.

In August 2018, it was reported that Griffith would be returning to The Young and the Restless this time as supervising producer. Griffith's first episode as supervising producer aired on September 14, 2018.

In December 2018, Daytime Confidential reported that Griffith would once again act as The Young and the Restless's Head Writer following the departure of Mal Young.

Positions held
As the World Turns (hired by Hogan Sheffer)
 Script Writer: April 12, 2005 – June 29, 2006; December 14, 2009 – September 17, 2010

Days of Our Lives
 Co-Head Writer: August 19, 2015 – September 2, 2016

General Hospital (hired by Brian Frons; fired by Robert Guza, Jr.)
 Story Consultant: July 2009 – August 21, 2009
 Breakdown Writer: August 7 & 17, 2009
 Script Writer: August 21, 2009

One Life to Live
 Associate Head Writer: 1991–1994, March 23, 2004 – September 28, 2004
 Co-Head Writer: 1992 – September 1995, March 10, 2003 – March 21, 2004
 Head Writer: February 3, 2003 – March 7, 2003

Santa Barbara
 Breakdown Writer: 1988–1991
 Script Writer: 1988–1991

Sunset Beach
 Co-Creator: (with Robert Guza, Jr.) 1997

The Young and the Restless (hired by Barbara Bloom)
 Breakdown Writer: July 13, 2006 – October 2006
 Creative Consultant: July 7, 2006 – September 2006
 Co-Executive Producer: October 25, 2006 – December 24, 2007; February 6, 2019 – February 6, 2023
 Head writer: December 26, 2007 – April 21, 2008; October 12, 2012 – November 1, 2013; March 20, 2019 – present
 Executive Producer: October 25, 2006 – October 2, 2008; February 7, 2023 – present
 Supervising Producer: September 14, 2018 – February 5, 2019

Writing history

|-

|-

|-

|-

|-

Executive producing tenure

|-

Awards and nominations

External links
Interview with OLTL Head Writers Josh Griffith and Michael Malone
ABC Daytime Press Release

References

Griffith
Soap opera producers
American male television writers
People from New York (state)
American television producers
Daytime Emmy Award winners
Writers Guild of America Award winners
Year of birth missing (living people)
Living people